Konthamuru is a locality in Rajamahendravaram City. It is a part of "Greater Rajamahendravaram Municipal Corporation (GRMC)".

References

Villages in East Godavari district